Rahasia is an adventure module, self-published by DayStar West Media in 1980 and published by TSR, Inc. in 1983 and 1984, for the Basic Set rules of the Dungeons & Dragons fantasy role-playing game. Its product designation is TSR 9115. It was designed by Tracy and Laura Hickman, and features artwork by Jeff Easley and Timothy Truman.

Plot summary
In RPGA1 Rahasia, the heroes seek to save a kidnapped elven maid, and to do so they must enter the Temple of the Sacred Black Rock, break a curse, and capture the evil Rahib.

In the revised module B7 Rahasia, the adventurers must save a group of kidnapped elven women held in the dungeons beneath a good elven temple taken over by an evil cleric.

An elven village is threatened by a dark Priest known only as the Rahib. He has kidnapped two of the village's fairest maidens and now demands that Rahasia, the most beautiful elf, surrender herself to free the others. The player characters are drawn into this adventure when they find a plea for help from Rahasia. The only way to free the captured maidens is to enter an old temple, built upon the ruins of a wizard's tower buried under a mountain.

Publication history
The original Rahasia was written by Laura Hickman, and was first published in 1979 by DayStar West Media as a 32-page booklet. Daystar West Media was Tracy Hickman's private publishing company, and no more than 200 copies were ever printed. Rahasia was the first in the Night Ventures line of scenarios.

The Hickmans decided to privately publish the first two adventures they had designed together, Rahasia and Pharaoh, which gained them a reputation on a local level. However, disaster struck when Tracy went into business with an associate who went bad, leaving the Hickmans to cover $30,000 in bad checks. They were driven into bankruptcy, and Tracy decided to sell their modules to TSR, "literally so that I could buy shoes for my children". TSR decided not only to buy the modules, but hire Tracy as a game designer.  He said of the event: "They said it would be easier to publish my adventures if I was part of the company. So, we made the move from Utah to Wisconsin."

Tracy and Laura Hickman rewrote Rahasia, which was published by TSR in 1983 as a sixteen-page booklet with an outer folder, with the code RPGA1, and sold as a limited edition only to members of the RPGA. In 1984, TSR revised and compiled RPGA1 Rahasia and the second tournament module RPGA2 Black Opal Eye, and published the combined adventure as B7 Rahasia, a 32-page booklet with an outer folder, featuring cover art by Jeff Easley and interior art by Easley and Tim Truman. 

This module was later featured in the compilation B1–B9 In Search of Adventure in 1987.

Credits
Design: Tracy and Laura Hickman
Editing: Curtis Smith
Cover Art: Jeff Easley
Interior Art: Jeff Easley and Timothy Truman
Cartography: David S. "Diesel" LaForce and David C. Sutherland III
Art Direction: Ruth Hoyer

Reception
Wayne Ligon reviewed the adventure in The Space Gamer No. 73. Ligon commented, "A nice story combined with an interesting temple complex makes this module a good one. The villains are well-portrayed and have definite objectives." He felt that this was a good module all in all, because the emphasis is not on killing, and the module forces the players to think.

In his review of B1-9 In Search of Adventure in Dragon magazine #128 (December 1987), Ken Rolston calls Rahasia one of the "two exceptionally fine adventures" in the compilation, and "a classic low-level FRPG scenario".

See also
 List of Dungeons & Dragons modules

References and Footnotes

External links
B7 Rahasia
http://www.rpg.net/news+reviews/reviews/rev_4120.html

Dungeons & Dragons modules
Mystara
Role-playing game supplements introduced in 1980